The Diocese of Estância is a Latin Church ecclesiastical territory or diocese of the Catholic Church located in the city of Estância. It is a suffragan in the ecclesiastical province of metropolitan Archdiocese of Aracajú in Brazil.

History
 April 30, 1960: Established as Diocese of Estância from the Diocese of Aracaju

Bishops

Ordinaries
 Bishops of Estância (Roman rite), in reverse chronological order
 Bishop Giovanni Crippa, I.M.C. (2014.07.9 Jul 2014 - )
 Bishop Marco Eugênio Galrão Leite de Almeida (2003.04.30 – 2013.09.25), appointed Auxiliary Bishop of São Salvador da Bahia
 Bishop Hildebrando Mendes Costa (1986.03.25 – 2003.04.30)
 Bishop José Bezerra Coutinho (1961.01.28 – 1985.06.01)

Other priests of this diocese who became bishops
Dulcênio Fontes de Matos, appointed Auxiliary Bishop of Aracajú, Sergipe in 2001
Paulo Celso Dias do Nascimento (priest here, 1989-2012), appointed Auxiliary Bishop of São Sebastião do Rio de Janeiro in 2017

Sources
 GCatholic.org
 Catholic Hierarchy

Roman Catholic dioceses in Brazil
Christian organizations established in 1960
Estancia, Roman Catholic Diocese of
Roman Catholic dioceses and prelatures established in the 20th century
1960 establishments in Brazil